The European Union–Mercosur free trade agreement is a proposed free trade agreement on which the European Union and Mercosur reached agreement in principle in 2019. The planned deal was announced on 28 June at the 2019 G20 Osaka summit after twenty years of negotiations. Although there is agreement in principle, the final texts have not been finalised, signed, or ratified and therefore have not entered into force. If ratified, it would represent the largest trade deal struck by both the EU and Mercosur, in terms of numbers of citizens involved. The draft trade deal is part of a wider Association Agreement between the two blocs. Besides trade, the association agreement would also deal with cooperation and political dialogue. Negotiations on these two parts were concluded on 18 June 2020.

Background
The agreement in principle came after twenty years of negotiation. Talks began in 1999, but stalled before regaining momentum in 2016. Talks had foundered for years due to opposition from European beef producers, especially small farmers who feared being undercut on price by imports from Brazil, the world's biggest beef producer. Many governments in South America at this time preferred "south-south co-operation" to developing ties with Europe, while European governments similarly had other priorities.

The growing use of protectionist policies by national leaders is considered to have spurred the renewal of talks in 2016. The EU may have hoped that the emerging deal would represent a significant break in this global renewal of protectionism. European Commission President Jean-Claude Juncker cited the deal as an endorsement of "rules-based trade" in a time of growing protectionism. Mercosur may be hoping to use the deal as a model for future deals. Mercosur's presidents have already stated that they want to reach trade agreements with Canada and the European Free Trade Association. Argentina's president Mauricio Macri has said that the agreement with the EU is "not a point of arrival but of departure".

In 2018, the EU was already Mercosur's largest trading and investment partner. 20.1% of the trade bloc's exports went to the EU in 2018. Mercosur exports to the EU were worth €42.6 billion in that year, while EU exports to the Mercosur countries were worth €45 billion. Mercosur's biggest exports to EU countries are agricultural products such as food, beverages and tobacco, vegetable products including soya and coffee, and meat and other animal products. Europe's biggest exports to Mercosur include machinery, transport equipment, and chemical and pharmaceutical products. The EU exported €23 billion worth of services to the South American trade bloc in 2017 while about €11 billion worth of services came from Mercosur into Europe.

Despite the value of the trading, significant tariffs remain in place, meaning potential expansion of markets should these tariffs be removed. The EU wants more access for its manufactured goods especially cars, which face tariffs of 35%, and more access to contracts for its firms and wine and cheese to sell. The primary aim of the Mercosur countries is to boost sales of farm commodities.

Features
The combined population of the two regions means that the deal would involve a population of 780 million. It would be the largest free trade deal agreed by Mercosur since the bloc's launch in 1991 and would also represent the EU's largest trade deal to date, in terms of tariff reduction.

For Mercosur the planned deal will eliminate 93% of tariffs to the EU and grant “preferential treatment” for the remaining 7%. The deal will allow increased access to the European market for Mercosur's agricultural goods, notably beef, poultry, sugar and ethanol. The deal will probably also be good for Brazilian juice exporters and Argentine fish exporters. It will also remove 91% of tariffs on EU exports to the Mercosur countries. According to the Financial Times, “some of the most important wins for Europe include the slashing of duties on cars and car parts, chemicals, machinery and textiles, and improved market access for EU wine and cheese”. €4.5 billion worth of duties will be saved, according to the European Commission. The deal includes a standstill clause whereby remaining tariffs will not be raised above an agreed rate.

The scope of the agreement is very broad. Besides tariffs, it covers Rules of Origin, Trade Remedies, Sanitary and Phytosanitary Measures (SPS), Technical Barriers to Trade (TBT), Services and Investment liberalization, Competition Policy, Subsidies, State Owned Enterprises (SOE), Trade and Sustainable Development. It also includes increased access to public procurement contracts and Intellectual Property Rights including "Geographical Indications" or protection for regional food specialities. Legal guarantees will be put in place protecting 357 European food and drink products from imitation including Prosciutto di Parma and Fromage de Herve. Customs procedures will also be simplified under the deal.

If ratified, the changes will be phased in over 15 years.

Opposition
The planned deal has been denounced by European beef farmers, environmental activists and indigenous rights campaigners.

Protests against the deal have taken place. Governments and parliaments of the EU members states have also criticised the agreement. In October 2020 both the European Parliament  and the European Commissioner for Trade Valdis Dombrovskis  have stated that the EU-Mercosur agreement "cannot be approved as its stands".

European farmers
The deal is expected to trigger a huge surge of Argentinean and Brazilian beef exports to all EU countries. Under the agreement, the EU will open its markets to a quota of up to 99,000 tonnes of beef per year at a preferential rate of 7.5% tariffs. Farmers throughout the EU oppose this, particularly smaller farmers who fear being undercut on price. The COPA-COGECA union, which represents 23 million farmers across the EU, warned the deal “will go down in history as a very dark moment”. The Irish Farmers' Association denounced the deal as a “disgraceful and feeble sell-out”.

Environmentalists

Of concern also is the potential environmental impact of the agreement, in particular that it could represent a setback in the fight against climate change. The Amazon rainforest is one of the world's largest carbon sinks. But the amount of carbon that the Amazon is absorbing from the atmosphere and storing each year has fallen by around a third in the last decade. This decline in the Amazon carbon sink amounts to one billion tonnes of carbon dioxide – equivalent to over twice the UK’s annual emissions. Since the election of Jair Bolsonaro as President of Brazil deforestation of the Amazon has intensified. The deforestation of the Amazon is now at its highest rate in a decade, with 2018 seeing a 13% increase in deforestation.

Cattle farming is the single largest driver of Amazon deforestation, and has been responsible for as much as 80% of the deforestation. The current increased rate of rainforest destruction comes at a time of record beef exports from Brazil. The fear is that the deal could lead to even more deforestation as it expands market access to Brazilian beef. EU leaders have responded to criticism by stating that the terms of the deal do not contravene the targets of the Paris climate agreement and that the trade deal highlights a commitment to “rules-based trade”. Yet, as Jonathan Watts points out, “there are countless reports of rule-breaking by Brazilian meat companies”. Many experts consider the environmental provisions in the current text of the deal to be “toothless” as they lack enforcement powers  Brazil is a signatory to the Paris climate agreement but President Bolsonaro has criticised it and threatened to pull Brazil out. As mentioned above, deforestation of the Amazon has intensified under Bolsonaro. He has been accused of weakening Brazil's environmental ministry, encouraging farming and mining expansion in the area and turning a blind eye to illegal destruction. The current environment minister, Ricardo Salles, has imposed the lowest number of fines for illegal deforestation in a decade.

According to Jonathan Watts ‘negotiations took almost two decades, which may explain why the outcome signed last week reflects the pro-industry values of the past rather than the environmental concerns of the present’. An editorial in The Irish Times states “EU countries are committing to achieving net-zero carbon by 2050, but this will prove meaningless if the planet’s greatest carbon sink is destroyed.”  Former French environment minister Nicolas Hulot denounced the agreement in an interview with Le Monde, claiming that is "completely contradictory" to the EU's climate goals and warning that it would enable further destruction of the Amazon rainforest. Fears have been expressed in the Financial Times that the “EU-Mercosur deal will cancel out climate efforts”.

Indigenous rights activists

Aside from the threat to the climate, deforestation would directly impact Brazil's indigenous communities, who are already facing a worsening situation. Since becoming president, Bolsonaro has attempted to strip the indigenous agency FUNAI of its responsibility to identify and demarcate indigenous land and hand that power to the Agriculture ministry. Such a move would "put the fox in charge of the chicken coop", according to opposition Senator Randolfe Rodrigues. He has also defunded agencies responsible for law enforcement in the Amazon. Indigenous communities are facing direct threats. In 2019 an estimated 20,000 goldminers illegally invaded Yanomami Indigenous Territory, one of Brazil's largest indigenous territories. Yanomami campaigners have accused the president of encouraging the invasion by stating that indigenous people had too much land and that large-scale mining and extensive monoculture should be allowed on indigenous territory.

Dinaman Tuxá, an indigenous leader, has said that "Accords like this only raise the level of violence against indigenous people. We need to tell the EU that signing this free-trade agreement could lead to genocide in Brazil. If they sign this agreement, blood will be spilled.”

On June 18, 2019 over 340 civil society organizations wrote to call on the EU to halt the trade negotiations immediately and use their leverage as Brazil's second largest trading partner to improve the human rights situation in Brazil under Bolsonaro. The letter noted the decision to put indigenous land demarcation under the remit of the Agriculture ministry where the agribusiness lobby has powerful sway and repeated attacks and invasions of indigenous land by profit seekers. It also noted previous suspension of trade preferences with countries involved in human rights violations such as Myanmar and the Philippines in addition to restricting import of products related to human rights abuses such as conflict minerals. This letter echoed a similar plea made in May by 600 European scientists and 300 indigenous groups, which called on the EU to demand that Brazil respect environmental and human rights standards as a precondition for concluding the Mercosur trade negotiations.

Governments and parliaments

After Brazilian president Jair Bolsonaro received much criticism concerning the protection of the Amazon rain forest, both Ireland and France voiced concern, and threatened a veto on the agreement unless action is taken by the Brazilian government.

In July 2019 a symbolic motion rejecting the trade deal was passed in Dáil Éireann, the lower house of the Irish legislature, by 84 votes to 46. On 8 August 2019 the Luxemburg trade minister indicated that the implementation of the Paris Climate Agreement was a necessary condition for signing the EU-Mercosur trade deal. On 28 August Slovak Agriculture Minister Gabriela Matečná said Slovakia would block the agreement because of Brazil's unacceptable approach to the Amazon fires.

In September 2019, lawmakers on the Austrian parliament's EU subcommittee almost unanimously voted to reject the draft free trade agreement citing concerns over their national farming sector and the Amazon forest fires. As such the government is obliged to veto the pact at EU level, where all 28 member states and their parliaments must agree to trade deals. Lawmakers from the centre-right ÖVP and the far-right Freedom Party also voted to reject the deal.

On 20 January 2020 the government of the Belgian region Wallonia took formal position against the agreement. The Walloon parliament unanimously (70-0) endorsed this position on 5 February 2020.

On 2 June 2020 the Dutch House of Representatives adopted a motion rejecting the agreement with a narrow majority. The government of the Belgian capital region Brussels stated on 14 July 2020 that the agreement was unacceptable in its current form and listed a series of preconditions. This position was endorsed by a Parliamentary commission on 10 October 2020.

On 20 August 2020 the German Chancellor Angela Merkel expressed doubts about the EU-Mercosur trade deal and whether it could go through in its current form.

On 29 September 2020 Tánaiste Leo Varadkar said that Ireland would not ratify the EU-Mercosur trade deal unless new enforceable environmental guarantees were added.

Finalization, signature and ratification

After the adoption and publication of the 17-page "agreement in principle" on 1 July 2019, 29 unfinished texts of chapters and annexes of the trade agreement were published in July and September with a disclaimer that they were published "for information purposes only and may undergo further modifications including as a result of the process of legal revision". The essential liberalization schedules for goods, services and investment have not yet been released.

In the meantime negotiations for the other parts of the EU-Mercosur Association Agreement have continued and were concluded on 18 June 2020 with an agreement on the pillars of political dialogue and cooperation, the preamble and the institutional and final provisions. This text has not been published yet by the official instances, but was leaked by Greenpeace. Greenpeace condemned the fact that commitments to protect nature or to tackle the climate emergency, as laid down in the UNFCC Paris Agreement, were not included in the conditions under which either of the parties could sanction the other, or suspend the agreement.

Once the texts are final and legally revised they would need to be translated in all EU and Mercosur official languages.

The texts would then be presented by the European Commission to the Council of Ministers of the European Union for approval, where unanimity is required. If approved the Council would sign the agreement and send it over to the Mercosur countries and to the European Parliament. An EU association agreement would also need to be approved by the national parliaments of all EU member states. Ratification of the agreement by the national parliaments of the Mercosur countries would also be required. All together this is a process that may take many years in itself. However in the EU the trade part of the agreement (and some elements of the preamble, institutional and final provisions) may already be implemented provisionally after the ratification by the Mercosur and the approval of the European Parliament.
The European Commission may also decide to present the trade pillar as a separate trade agreement. If the Mercosur countries and the Council agree with that, the separate trade agreement does not need to be approved by the parliaments of the EU member states (as trade is an exclusive EU competence), the approval of the European Parliament suffices. What is left of the association agreement must still be approved by all the national parliaments and cannot be implemented provisionally.

There are a number of potential barriers that could stop the deal from being ratified. For example, the election of a more left-wing candidate in the 2019 Argentine general election. The increased presence of environmentalists in the European Parliament following the 2019 election has also been noted. The Economist speculated that distance and other priorities may cause a loss of interest similar to that which delayed the talks for so long.

See also
 European Union–Mercosur relations
 European Union free trade agreements

External links
 EU-Mercosur trade agreement: The Agreement in Principle and its texts, preliminary text on the website of the European Commission, 2019-07-12

References

Free trade agreements of the European Union
Free trade agreements of Mercosur
Mercosur
Proposed free trade agreements